John Hauck (August 20, 1829 – June 4, 1896) was a German-born American brewer and bank president. He was also an executive of the Cincinnati Red Stockings professional baseball team in the mid-1880s. His former residence in Cincinnati is now the Hauck House Museum.

Biography

Hauck came to the United States from Bavaria at the age of 22, and worked for his uncle, Cincinnati brewer George M. Herancourt. In 1863, Hauck formed his own beer brewery, originally named Hauck & Windisch and later the John Hauck Brewing Company, in Cincinnati's west end, and soon became wealthy. Hauck was also president of the city's German National Bank.

Hauck became principal owner of the Cincinnati Red Stockings after the 1885 season, taking over from George L. Herancourt, his cousin, who went bankrupt. Hauck delegated to his son, Louis, the day-to-day management of the club. The 1886 Red Stockings finished in fifth place in the American Association. Following that season, Hauck sold the team to Aaron S. Stern, who had previously owned the team several years earlier.

Hauck was married in 1858; he and his wife, Catherine, had a son and a daughter. Hauck died in June 1896 and was buried in Cincinnati's Spring Grove Cemetery.

Notes

References

External links
Cincinnati Reds history

1829 births
1896 deaths
People from Munich
German emigrants to the United States
American business executives
American brewers
Cincinnati Reds owners
Cincinnati Reds executives
Burials at Spring Grove Cemetery
19th-century American businesspeople